Mike Simmonds (born May 9, 1964) is a former professional football player and current college football assistant coach.

He played college football at Indiana State.
 
He was drafted and signed by the Tampa Bay Buccaneers in 1987 and spent three seasons there, he was activated from the practice squad for 5 games during the 1989 season.  He spent one season on the San Diego Chargers practice squad. 

He began his coaching career at Hillsborough High in Tampa before moving to Jefferson High as a head coach, during his seven-year tenure (1998–2005), his team reached the Florida High School Championship game three times (1998, 2002, 2004).

He started his college coaching career in 2005.

References

External links
http://unipanthers.com/coaches.aspx?rc=596
http://gosycamores.com/hof.aspx?hof=117

1964 births
Living people
Sportspeople from Belleville, Illinois
Players of American football from Illinois
Indiana State Sycamores football players
San Diego Chargers players
Tampa Bay Buccaneers players